In computer science, a 2–3 heap is a data structure, a variation on the heap, designed by Tadao Takaoka in 1999. The structure is similar to the Fibonacci heap, and borrows from the 2–3 tree.

Time costs for some common heap operations are:

 Delete-min takes  amortized time.
 Decrease-key takes constant amortized time.
 Insertion takes constant amortized time.

Polynomial of trees   
A linear tree of size  is a sequential path of  nodes with the first node as a root of the tree and it is represented by a bold  (e.g.  is a linear tree of a single node). Note that this definition of product is associative but not commutative.

An r-ary polynomial of trees is defined as  where . This polynomial notation for trees of  nodes is unique. The tree  is actually  copy of  that their roots are connected with  edges sequentially and the path of these  edge is called the main trunk of the tree . Furthermore, an r-ary polynomial of trees is called an r-nomial queue if nodes of the polynomial of trees are associated with keys in heap property.

Operations on r-nomial queues 
If  we will have a term of form  and a carry tree . Otherwise, we would have only a tree . So the sum of two r-nomial queues are actually similar to the addition of two number in base .

An insertion of a key into a polynomial queue is like merging a single node with the label of the key into the existing r-nomial queue, taking  time.

(2,3)-heap  
Note that the root of the tree  has degree .

Operations on (2,3)-heap 
Delete-min: First of all, we find the minimum by scanning the root of the trees.

Insertion: In order to insert a new key, we merge the currently existing (2,3)-heap with a single node tree,  labeled with this key.

Decrease Key: To be done!

References 

Heaps (data structures)